Roderick McLeod may refer to:
 Roderick McLeod (British Army officer)
 Roderick McLeod (politician)
 Roderick McLeod (minister)

See also
 Roderick Macleod (disambiguation)